Caponina is a genus of araneomorph spiders in the family Caponiidae, first described by Eugène Simon in 1892.

Species
 it contains twelve species:
Caponina alegre Platnick, 1994 – Brazil
Caponina cajabamba Platnick, 1994 – Peru
Caponina chilensis Platnick, 1994 – Chile
Caponina chinacota Platnick, 1994 – Colombia
Caponina longipes Simon, 1893 – Venezuela
Caponina notabilis (Mello-Leitão, 1939) – Brazil, Uruguay, Argentina
Caponina papamanga Brescovit & Sánchez-Ruiz, 2013 – Brazil
Caponina paramo Platnick, 1994 – Colombia
Caponina pelegrina Bryant, 1940 – Cuba
Caponina sargi F. O. Pickard-Cambridge, 1899 – Guatemala, Costa Rica
Caponina testacea Simon, 1892 (type) – St. Vincent
Caponina tijuca Platnick, 1994 – Brazil

References

Araneomorphae genera
Caponiidae
Spiders of Central America
Spiders of South America
Taxa named by Eugène Simon